Sowghanchi (also Romanized as Sowghānchī) is a village in Ajorluy-ye Gharbi Rural District, Baruq District, Miandoab County, West Azerbaijan Province, Iran. At the 2020 census, its population was 100, in 25 families.

References 

Populated places in Miandoab County